Abano is a village in Shida Kartli region, Georgia. It is part of the Bredza commune, Kareli municipality, with the population of 239, mostly (99.2%) ethnic Georgians, as of the 2014 census.

Abano is located on the Lopanistskali river at 720 meters above sea level, 27 km. northwest of the town of Kareli.

See also
 Shida Kartli

References

Populated places in Shida Kartli